The 1899–1900 Scottish Districts season is a record of all the rugby union matches for Scotland's district teams.

History

Edinburgh District beat Glasgow District for the first time in 10 years, in the Inter-City match.

Results

Inter-City

Glasgow District:

Edinburgh District:

Other Scottish matches

North of Scotland:

Midlands: 

North of Scotland:

South-West: 

South of Scotland:

Anglo-Scots:

English matches

No other District matches played.

International matches

No touring matches this season.

References

1899–1900 in Scottish rugby union
Scottish Districts seasons